Super Trolley, is a 1988 video game produced by Icon Design where the player takes control of a supermarket employee. It was created as a tie-in with the BBC show Jim'll Fix It.

Gameplay
Players control a supermarket worker who is tasked with stocking the supermarket shelves, finding lost babies and removing dogs from the store. The objective of the game is to successfully complete each day's tasks from Monday through to Saturday, the latter being the busiest day of the week, without being sacked. As this is accomplished the player's character is promoted, eventually becoming the store manager and sacking his former employer.

Before shelves can be filled the player must price each item in the warehouse, which involves attaching labels to goods.

Development
The game was developed after a wish by Andrew Collett was sent to the BBC's television programme, Jim'll Fix It. The inlay card artwork depicts a cartoon of the show's presenter Jimmy Savile pushing a shopping trolley.

Reception

References

External links
 Entry at GameSpot.com

1988 video games
Commodore 64 games
Amstrad CPC games
ZX Spectrum games
Video games developed in the United Kingdom
Mastertronic games